Asian Sailing Championship is a biennal Asian Championship multi-class sailing regatta organised by the Asian Sailing Federation.

Editions

Optimist Asian & Oceanian Championships 
IODA (International Optimist Dinghy Association) Asian & Oceanian Championships

RS:X Asian Windsurfing Championships

Equipment

Legend: M – Men; W – Women; Mx – Mixed; O – Open; B – Boys; G – Girls;(h) – heavyweight;(l) – lightweight;

References

 ISAF World Sailing Federation
 14th 2010 Asian Sailing Championships
 15th 2012 Asian Sailing Championships
 16th 2014 Asian Sailing Championships
 17th 2016 Asian Sailing Championships

 
Asian championships in sailing